Greatest Hits is the first compilation album by American country music artist Tanya Tucker. It was released on December 2, 1974 via Columbia Records.

Track listing

Chart performance

References

1974 compilation albums
Tanya Tucker albums
Albums produced by Billy Sherrill
Columbia Records compilation albums